Artem Karpov (born 23 September 1986) is a Russian male badminton player.

Achievements

BWF International Challenge/Series
Men's Doubles

 BWF International Challenge tournament
 BWF International Series tournament
 BWF Future Series tournament

References

External links 

Living people
Russian male badminton players
1986 births